is a retrograde irregular satellite of Jupiter. It was discovered by a team of astronomers from the University of Hawaii led by Scott S. Sheppard et al. in 2003.

 is about 2 kilometres in diameter, and orbits Jupiter at an average distance of 22,700 Mm in approximately 700 days, at an inclination of 164° to the ecliptic, in a retrograde direction and with an eccentricity of 0.34.

It belongs to the Carme group.

This moon was considered lost until its recovery was announced on 12 October 2022.

References 

Carme group
Moons of Jupiter
Irregular satellites
Astronomical objects discovered in 2003
Moons with a retrograde orbit